Underground is a children's picture book written and illustrated by Shane W. Evans.  It was published by Roaring Brook Press in 2011 and received the Coretta Scott King Award for Illustrators in 2012. The book depicts a 19th-century African-American family of slaves as they escape from a plantation and navigate the Underground Railroad to freedom.

Awards and honors
 School Library Journal's Best Nonfiction Books of 2011
 Coretta Scott King Award for Illustrators (2012)
 American Library Association Notable Children's Books (2012)
 NCTE/CLA Notable Children's Books in the Language Arts (2012)

References

Works about the Underground Railroad
Books about African-American history
American picture books
2011 children's books
Coretta Scott King Award-winning works